The 2017 ISM Connect 300 was a Monster Energy NASCAR Cup Series race held on September 24, 2017, at New Hampshire Motor Speedway in Loudon, New Hampshire. Contested over 300 laps on the  speedway, it was the 28th race of the 2017 Monster Energy NASCAR Cup Series season, second race of the Playoffs and second race of the Round of 16.

On March 8, 2017 it was announced that the fall NHMS date would move to Las Vegas Motor Speedway starting in 2018.

Report

Background

New Hampshire Motor Speedway is a  oval speedway located in Loudon, New Hampshire which has hosted NASCAR racing annually since the early 1990s, as well as an IndyCar weekend and the oldest motorcycle race in North America, the Loudon Classic. Nicknamed "The Magic Mile", the speedway is often converted into a  road course, which includes much of the oval.

The track was originally the site of Bryar Motorsports Park before being purchased and redeveloped by Bob Bahre. The track is currently one of eight major NASCAR tracks owned and operated by Speedway Motorsports.

Entry list

First practice

Qualifying

Qualifying results

Practice (post-qualifying)

Second practice

Final practice

Race

Race results

Stage results

Stage 1
Laps: 75

Stage 2
Laps: 75

Final stage results

Stage 3
Laps: 150

Race statistics
 Lead changes: 3 among different drivers
 Cautions/Laps: 6 for 32
 Red flags: 1 for 13 minutes and 1 second
 Time of race: 2 hours, 54 minutes and 47 seconds
 Average speed:

Media

Television
NBC Sports covered the race on the television side. Rick Allen, Jeff Burton – the all-time wins leader at New Hampshire Motor Speedway with four wins – and Steve Letarte had the call in the booth for the race. Parker Kligerman, Marty Snider and Kelli Stavast reported from pit lane during the race.

Radio
The Performance Racing Network had the radio call for the race, which was simulcast on Sirius XM NASCAR Radio.

Standings after the race

Drivers' Championship standings

Manufacturers' Championship standings

Note: Only the first 16 positions are included for the driver standings.

References

ISM Connect 300
ISM Connect 300
NASCAR races at New Hampshire Motor Speedway
ISM Connect 300